The first Iranian Assembly of Experts election was held on December 10, 1982, to elect all 82 members in 24 constituencies. 18,013,061 citizens voted in the elections, marking a 77.38% turnout. Out of 168 individuals registered to run, 146 (86.90%) were qualified allowed to do so.

Held in two-round system, 76 seats were decided in the first round, as well as 7 in the second round.

Experts winning the elections made decisive resolutions, including electing Hussein-Ali Montazeri as the first and only "Deputy Supreme Leader of Iran" in May 1985, deposing him in November 1987, and electing the new Supreme Leader in June 1989.

See also
 List of members in the First Term of the Council of Experts

References

1982 elections in Iran
December 1982 events in Asia
1982
Iran